Vongdeuane Phongsavanh (born 1 May 1957) is a Laotian middle-distance runner. He competed in the men's 800 metres at the 1980 Summer Olympics.

References

External links
 

1957 births
Living people
Athletes (track and field) at the 1980 Summer Olympics
Laotian male middle-distance runners
Olympic athletes of Laos
Place of birth missing (living people)